The Healdsburg Carnegie Library, which was also known as the Healdsburg Public Library and is now the Healdsburg Museum, is a Carnegie library built in 1911.  It was listed on the National Register of Historic Places in 1988, at which time there was a modern library under construction elsewhere and there were plans for this building to be modified for handicapped accessibility and otherwise restored so that it could become the Healdsburg Museum.

Architect Brainerd Jones designed the building in Classical Revival style;  it was built during 1910-11 by contractor Frank Sullivan.

As of early 2021, the Healdsburg Museum is temporarily closed.

See also
Healdsburg Memorial Bridge, also listed on the National Register

References

External links
Healdsburg Museum & Historical Society

National Register of Historic Places in Sonoma County, California
Library buildings completed in 1911
Carnegie libraries in California